¿Y Ahora Qué Hacemos? is the ninth album by the Spanish rock group Jarabe de Palo, released on March 1, 2011, following the release of the single "¿Y ahora que hacemos?" on February 8.

Track listing 
 ¡Yep! - 3:41
 Para Enredar - 3:44
 Alas - 3:49
 La Quiero a Morir (con Alejandro Sanz) - 3:18
 ¿Y Ahora Que Hacemos? - 3:03
 Fin (con Carlos Tarque-McLan) - 2:58
 Hice Mal Algunas Cosas (con Joaquin Sabina y Carlos Tarque-McLan) - 3:14
 Soy Un Bicho - 4:32
 Amor de Todo a 100 - 3:02
 Frío (con Antonio Orozco) - 4:19
 Niña Sara - 5:00
 Tú Me Hacías Sonreir - 4:20
 Breve Historia de Un Músico Persona - 4:32

2011 albums
Spanish-language albums
Jarabe de Palo albums